Gerbstedt is a small town in Saxony-Anhalt, district Mansfeld-Südharz. It was traditionally dominated by of copper mining, presently agriculture is dominant.

Geography

Divisions
The town of Gerbstedt is divided into twelve localities (Ortschaften), corresponding to the twelve former municipalities that formed the current town in 2010. Some of the localities consist of a number of Ortsteile (local parts).

 Augsdorf
 Freist (incl. Elben, Oeste, Reidewitz, Zabitz)
 Friedeburg
 Friedeburgerhütte (incl. Adendorf)
 Gerbstedt
 Heiligenthal (incl. Helmsdorf, Lochwitz)
 Hübitz
 Ihlewitz (incl. Pfeiffhausen, Straußhof, Thaldorf)
 Rottelsdorf (incl. Bösenburg)
 Siersleben (incl. Thondorf)
 Welfesholz
 Zabenstedt

Sons and daughters of the town

 Otto Brosowski (1885–1947), mining worker, KPD member
 Eugen Ray (1957–1986), athlete
 Valentin Haussmann (died c. 1611), composer

Other persons associated with Gerbstedt

 Rikdag, (died 985), Margrave of Meißen
 Friedrich Gottlieb Klopstock, (1724–1803), poet, spent his youth in Friedeburg
 Eckard I, Margrave of Meissen, buried in the Abbey

References

 
Mansfeld-Südharz